The 2015 Islands District Council election was held on 22 November 2015 to elect all 10 elected members to the 18-member Islands District Council.

Overall election results
Before election:

Change in composition:

References

External links
 Election Results - Overall Results

2015 Hong Kong local elections